Claude Horan (29 October 1917 – 11 June 2014) was an American ceramic and glass artist who was born in Long Beach, California.  He received a BA from San Jose State University in 1942 and an MA degree in art from Ohio State University in 1946.  His wife Suzi Pleyte Horan collaborated on many of the larger projects. He was a lifeguard and longboard surfer in Santa Cruz in the late 1930s, and is credited with naming Steamer Lane.

He started the ceramics program at the University of Hawaii at Manoa in 1947.  After a sabbatical in 1967 during which he learned glass blowing, Horan established a glass blowing studio at the university in 1968.  In 1978, he retired from the University of Hawaii as a professor emeritus.  Horan's students include Toshiko Takaezu, Isami Enomoto, Henry Takemoto, Chiu Huan-tang and Harue Oyama McVay, who became chairman of the ceramics program upon Horan's retirement.

Standing Female Figure, in the collection of the Honolulu Museum of Art is an example of the whimsical ceramic figurines for which he is best known.  He begins with a cylindrical vessel on the potter's wheel, onto which he sculpts human features.  The Hawaii State Art Museum, the Honolulu Museum of Art, the Museum of Arts and Design (New York City), and the Division of Ceramics and Glass of the National Museum of American History (Washington, D.C.) are among the public collections holding work by Claude Horan.  His sculptures in public places include:
 Untitled 1976 sculpture, Leilehua High School, Honolulu, Hawaii
 Hoolaulea (1976) and Cecil (1976), Red Hill Elementary School, Honolulu, Hawaii
 Vita Marinae, 1975, Waikiki Aquarium, Honolulu, Hawaii
 Na heenalu o kailua maluna o ke kilohana a na nalu, 1974, Kailua High School, Kailua, Hawaii
 Kii Kalai Mea Pa'ani Na Kamalii, 1974, Kealakehe Elementary School, Kailua-Kona, Hawaii
 The Stallion and His Crew, 1979, Pukalani Elementary School, Pukalani, Hawaii
 Moby Dick and Friends, 1980, Kekaha Elementary School, Kekaha, Hawaii
 In the Spirit of the Koolaus, 1980, Kalaheo High School, Kailua, Hawaii

References
 Haar, Francis, Artists of Hawaii: Volume Two, University of Hawaii Press, Honolulu, 1977, pp. 29–35
 Lagoria, Georgianna M., Claude Horan: A Restropective of Ceramic Works, The Contemporary Museum, Honolulu, 2004, 
 Mark, Steven, "Claude Horan: 1917-2014", June 28th, 2014, Honolulu Star-Advertiser
 Radford, Georgia and Warren Radford, Sculpture in the Sun, Hawaii's Art for Open Spaces, University of Hawaii Press, 1978, 79, 93–4.
 Wisnosky, John and Tom Klobe, A Tradition of Excellence, University of Hawai'i, Honolulu, 2002, pp. 60–63
 Yoshihara, Lisa A., Collective Visions, 1967-1997, An Exhibition Celebrating the 30th Anniversary of the State Foundation on Culture and the Arts, Art in Public Places Program, Presented at the Honolulu Academy of Arts, September 3-October 12, 1997, Honolulu, State Foundation on Culture and the Arts, 1997, p. 123.
 Claude Horan in the Art Inventories Catalog of the Smithsonian American Art Museum
   California, Birth Index, 1905-1995

Footnotes

20th-century ceramists
Modern sculptors
American glass artists
Ohio State University alumni
San Jose State University alumni
1917 births
2014 deaths
People from Long Beach, California
University of Hawaiʻi faculty
Ceramists from Hawaii
20th-century American sculptors
American male sculptors
20th-century American male artists